The Shuswap Country, or simply the Shuswap (pronounced  /ˈʃuːʃwɑːp/) and called Secwepemcúl̓ecw in Secwepemctsín, is a term used in the Canadian province of British Columbia to refer to the environs of Shuswap Lake.  The upper reaches of the Shuswap basin, southeast of Shuswap Lake and northeast of the Okanagan, are generally considered to be part of Okanagan or of the Monashee Country rather than "the Shuswap".  Roughly defined, the Shuswap Country begins on its west at the town of Chase, located on Little Shuswap Lake, west of which is the South Thompson area of the Thompson Country, and includes Adams Lake to the northwest of Shuswap Lake as well as communities in the Eagle River area as far as Craigellachie and/or Three Valley Gap, which is at the summit of Eagle Pass, beyond which eastwards is the Columbia Country.

Settlements and towns
Chase
Enderby (also considered part of the Okanagan)
Falkland
Grindrod (also considered part of the Okanagan)
Salmon Arm
Canoe
Sicamous
Malakwa
Celista
Scotch Creek
Sorrento
Seymour Arm

Usages
The Shuswap is often referred to in tandem form: Kamloops-Shuswap, Columbia-Shuswap, Okanagan-Shuswap/Shuswap-Okanagan.

See also
Kamloops-Shuswap, former federal electoral district
Okanagan-Shuswap, current federal electoral district

 
Interior of British Columbia